This is a list of intentional communities. An intentional community is a planned residential community designed from the start to have a high degree of social cohesion and teamwork. The members of an intentional community typically hold a common social, political, religious, or spiritual vision and often follow an alternative lifestyle. They typically share responsibilities and resources. Intentional communities include collective households, co-housing communities, co-living, ecovillages, monasteries, communes, survivalist retreats, kibbutzim, ashrams, and housing cooperatives. For directories, see external links below.

Africa 
 Awra Amba in the Amhara Region, Ethiopia
 Orania near Kimberley in the Northern Cape, South Africa

Asia and Oceania 
 Auroville in India

Australia 
 Gondwana Sanctuary, Byron Bay, New South Wales
 House of Freedom (community), Brisbane, Queensland, founder Athol Gill
 House of the Gentle Bunyip, Melbourne, Victoria, founder Athol Gill
 House of the New World, Sydney, New South Wales, founder John Hirt.
 Moora Moora, near Healesville, Victoria
 Rocky Cape Christian Community, Tasmania

Israel 

 Kibbutz Ketura
 Neve Shalom or Wahat al-Salam

Japan 
 Atarashiki-mura
 Owa Hutterite Colony

New Zealand 
 Centrepoint (founded 1977)
 Gloriavale Christian Community (founded )
 Jerusalem/Hiruharama (1970-1972)
 Maungapohatu (founded 1907)
 Ohu communities (1974- )
 Parihaka (founded )
 Rātana Pā (founded )
 Riverside Community, New Zealand (founded 1941)

Europe 
 Ängsbacka in Sweden
 Community of the Ark in La Borie Noble, France
 Montelibero, a libertarian community in Montenegro, based on ideas of the Free State Project

Denmark 
 Det Nødvendige Seminarium (DNS) in Denmark
 Freetown Christiania in Denmark
 Svanholm in Denmark

Italy 
 Federation of Damanhur in Piedmont, Italy
 Nomadelfia in Italy

Germany 
 Bruderhof Communities, originally in Germany but spread to other countries since
 Kommune Niederkaufungen in Germany
 ZEGG in Germany

Greece 
 Eutopia project (community) Greece
 Free and Real in Greece

Portugal 
 Ecoaldea Vegetariana Espiral in Cabeceiras de Basto, Portugal
 Tamera in Portugal

Spain 
  in Lacabe, Spain
 Global Tribe - Andalucia Spain

United Kingdom 
 Braziers Park in South Oxfordshire, England, United Kingdom
 Brithdir Mawr in Pembrokeshire, Wales
 Findhorn in Scotland
 New Creation Christian Community in the United Kingdom (closed)
 Tinker's Bubble in England

North America

Canada 
 Community Farm of the Brethren, Ontario, Canada
 Hutterite Christian Communities, existing in Australia, Canada, and the United States, but founded in Frenchman Butte, Saskatchewan
 Lifechanyuan International Family Society, Vancouver, B.C.
 Orthodox Mennonites, existing throughout Canada and the United States but founded in Ontario
 Poole's Land, Tofino, Vancouver Island, British Columbia
 Yarrow Ecovillage, Chilliwack, British Columbia

United States

Midwestern United States
 Bishop Hill Colony, Bishop Hill, Illinois, founded by Swedish pietist Eric Jansson
 Dancing Rabbit Ecovillage, Rutledge, Missouri 
 Dreamtime Village, West Lima, Wisconsin
 East Wind Community, Tecumseh, Missouri
 Elmendorf Christian Community, Mountain Lake, Minnesota
 Enright Ridge Urban Ecovillage, Cincinnati, Ohio
 The Homestead at Denison University, Granville, Ohio
 Jesus People USA (JPUSA), Chicago, Illinois
 Nottingham Housing Cooperative in Madison, Wisconsin
 Reba Place Fellowship is an intentional Christian community located in Evanston, Illinois within the Chicago metro area
 Stelle, Illinois, until 1982 an intentional community of the Stelle group
 Sunrise Colony, Saginaw, Michigan
 Sunward Cohousing, Ann Arbor, Michigan

Northeastern United States 
 The Abode of the Message, New Lebanon, New York
 Bruderhof Communities New York
Bryn Gweled Homesteads, Southampton, Pennsylvania
 The Free State Project, a state where libertarians concentrate their numbers in the state of New Hampshire to influence democracy
 Ganas, Staten Island, New York
 Mohegan Colony, Mohegan Lake, New York
 Sabbathday Lake Shaker Village, New Gloucester, Maine

Southern United States
 Acorn Community, Mineral, Virginia
 Adelphi, Texas
 Alleluia Community, Augusta, Georgia
 Believers in Christ, Lobelville, Tennessee
 Caneyville Christian Community, Caneyville, Kentucky
 Celo Community, Burnsville, North Carolina, United States
 The Farm, Summertown, Tennessee
 Heathcote Community Freeland, Maryland 
 Koinonia Farm, near Americus, Georgia
 Living energy farm, Louisa, Virginia
 Miccosukee Land Co-op, Tallahassee, Florida
 Noah Hoover Mennonites, existing in Belize, Canada, and the United States, but centered on Scottsville, Kentucky
 Paulville, Texas, a planned community for supporters of Ron Paul
 Serenbe, Chattahoochee Hills, Georgia
 Twelve Tribes communities, existing worldwide but founded in Chattanooga, Tennessee
 Twin Oaks Community, Louisa, Virginia
 Vernon Community, Hestand, Kentucky
 The Werehouse, Winston-Salem, North Carolina

Western United States 
 Alpha Farm, Deadwood, Oregon
 Avalon Organic Gardens & EcoVillage, founded by the Global Community Communications Alliance, Tumacacori, Arizona
 Black Bear Ranch, an 80-acre intentional community located in Siskiyou County, California
 Halcyon, California
 Kaliflower Commune, San Francisco, California
 Lafayette Morehouse, Lafayette, California
 Stone Curves, Tucson, Arizona
 The Seasteading Institute, an attempt to create artificial land in the ocean for libertarian migration. It is trying to build its first seastead in the San Francisco Bay, California.

Latin America 
 Gaviotas in Colombia
 Mazunte in Mexico

See also 

 Cohousing
 Communities Directory
 Cooperatives
 Ecovillage
 Egalitarian Communities
 Intentional community
 New Age communities
 Utopian socialism
 List of American utopian communities

References

External links 
 
 Foundation for Intentional Community database 
 Links to Christian Intentional Communities
 Diggers & Dreamers UK Directory
 Gondwana Sanctuary